210th Division may refer to:

 210th Coastal Defense Division
 210th Division (Israel)
 210th Division (People's Republic of China)
 210th Rifle Division

Military units and formations disambiguation pages